Gilligan's Planet is an American Saturday morning animated series produced by Filmation and MGM/UA Television which aired during the 1982–1983 season on CBS. It was the second animated spin-off of the sitcom Gilligan's Island (the first being The New Adventures of Gilligan).

Gilligan's Planet was the last cartoon series that Filmation produced for Saturday mornings; afterwards, they transitioned from Saturday mornings to producing cartoons exclusively for syndication. It was also the first Filmation series to feature the Lou Scheimer "signature" credit (as opposed to the rotating Lou Scheimer/Norm Prescott "wheel" credit which had been used since 1969). In addition, it was one of the last 1980s Saturday morning cartoons to be fitted with an adult laugh track, as the popularity of the practice had subsided.

Gilligan's Planet featured all of the original actors but one; Tina Louise, who has consistently refused to participate in any Gilligan's Island-related material since the series ended, again declined to reprise her role as Ginger Grant, who again was portrayed as a platinum blonde (as was the case in The New Adventures) instead of Louise's red hair. Dawn Wells, who had been unavailable during the production of The New Adventures of Gilligan, returned to the franchise, voicing both her own character (Mary Ann Summers) and Ginger.

Premise 
Gilligan's Planet is a spin-off of The New Adventures of Gilligan, based on the premise that the Professor had managed to build an operational interplanetary spaceship to get the castaways of the original cartoon series off the island.  True to the castaways' perpetual bad luck, they rocketed off into space and crash-landed on an unknown planet that supported human life. In many ways, the planet was like the island, but with a strangely colored and cratered surface with more land to get around. The rocket was severely damaged in the crash; thus, the castaways were still stranded and the Professor resumed his attempts to repair their only way home.

Overall, Gilligan's Planet re-presented the source material of the original live-action series with space and alien themes. Encounters with headhunters and other shipwrecked people instead became encounters with alien creatures. A new character named Bumper was added, who appeared as a reptilian alien pet/sidekick for Gilligan and company.

Production notes 
The theme song from The New Adventures of Gilligan was recycled, with new narration to explain the new show's premise. Sherwood Schwartz, who had hands-on involvement in the New Adventures series, was not as heavily involved in Gilligan's Planet. Two of the show's primary writers, Tom Ruegger and Paul Dini, would emerge at Warner Bros. Animation in the 1990s.

This is one of the few Filmation series not currently owned by successor Universal Television/Classic Media. It is instead owned by Turner Entertainment (via Warner Bros. Television) as it is a part of their pre-1986 Metro-Goldwyn-Mayer library.

Cast 

 Bob Denver as Gilligan
 Alan Hale Jr. as Skipper Jonas Grumby
 Jim Backus as Thurston Howell III
 Natalie Schafer as  "Lovey" Wentworth Howell
 Russell Johnson as Professor Roy Hinkley
 Dawn Wells as Mary Ann Summers, Ginger Grant
 Lou Scheimer as Bumper

Episodes

Home media 
On July 22, 2014, Warner Archive released Gilligan's Planet: The Complete Series on DVD in region 1 as part of their Warner Archive Collection. This is a manufacture-on-demand release, available exclusively through Warner's online store and Amazon.com.

See also 
 List of animated spin-offs from prime time shows

References

External links 
 Gilligan's Planet Cartoon Info @ Big Cartoon DataBase
 
 Gilligan's Planet at Don Markstein's Toonopedia. Archived from the original on August 28, 2016.

1982 American television series debuts
1983 American television series endings
1980s American animated television series
1980s American comic science fiction television series
American children's animated space adventure television series
American children's animated comic science fiction television series
American animated television spin-offs
CBS original programming
Planet
American sequel television series
English-language television shows
Television series created by Sherwood Schwartz
Television series by Warner Bros. Television Studios
Television series by Filmation
Television series set on fictional planets
Television shows directed by Hal Sutherland